Bobby Joe Conrad (born November 17, 1935 in Clifton, Texas) is a former professional American football wide receiver in the National Football League for the Chicago/St. Louis Cardinals and Dallas Cowboys. He played college football at Texas A&M University.

Early years
Conrad attended Clifton High School, where he was an All-state quarterback, while leading the team to back-to-back district championships in 1952 and 1953. As a senior, he scored 207 points and took Clifton to the state semi-finals where they lost to the eventual state champion Ranger High School.

He accepted a football scholarship from Texas A&M University to play under head coach Bear Bryant. He was a two-way player at halfback and end, although he also played quarterback and fullback. He never was a full-time starter and was a member of the school's 1956 SWC Championship team.

Conrad participated in the 1958 Chicago College All-Star Game and although he had never attempted a kick in college, he was able to make 4 field goals, 3 conversions, set the game scoring record with 15 points and also intercepted one pass in the 35-19 upset of the 1957 NFL Champion Detroit Lions.

In 1976, he was inducted into the Texas A&M Athletic Hall of Fame. In 2002, he was inducted into the Texas Sports Hall of Fame.

Professional career

New York Giants
Conrad was selected by the New York Giants in the fifth round (58th overall) of the 1958 NFL Draft. On May 10, he was traded along with safety Dick Nolan to the Chicago Cardinals, in exchange for End Pat Summerall and halfback Lindon Crow.

Chicago / St. Louis Cardinals
In 1958 as a rookie, he was a starter at defensive back and had 4 interceptions and one fumble recovered. On special teams, he made 6 out of 17 field goals and returned 19 punts for 129 yards (6.8-yard average).

In 1959, he was moved to the backfield with college teammate John David Crow. He had 74 carries for 328 yards (including a 56-yard run), 14 receptions for 142 yards, 6 touchdowns, made 6 out of 9 field goals, 18 kickoff returns for 388 yards and 16 punt returns for 133 yards (8.3-yard average).

In 1961, he was moved to flanker pairing him with Sonny Randle, while registering 30 receptions for 499 yards and 2 touchdowns. In 1962, he collected 63 receptions (third in the league) for 954 yards (ninth in the league) and 4 touchdowns.

In 1963, he led the league with 73 receptions and received All-NFL honors. He also had 967 receiving yards (sixth in the league) and 10 touchdowns.

In 1964, he posted 61 receptions (fourth in the league) for 780 yards and 6 touchdowns, receiving Pro Bowl honors. In 1965, he had 58 receptions for 909 yards and 5 touchdowns.

On June 26, 1969, he was traded to the Dallas Cowboys in exchange for a fifth round draft choice (#127-Barry Pierson).

He left as the seventh All-time pass receiver in the NFL with 418 receptions and had a string of 148 consecutive games played. After believing he came within a game of breaking Don Hutson's NFL record for consecutive games with a reception, it was discovered that Don Hutson's record was counted erroneously. Conrad set the record for most consecutive games with a reception; 94 contests from 1961 to 1968.

Dallas Cowboys
On September 20, 1969, the Dallas Cowboys put injured wide receiver Bob Hayes on the "move list" and activated Conrad. He played in 8 games, recording 4 receptions for 74 yards.

References

External links
Texas Sports Hall of Fame bio

1935 births
Living people
People from Clifton, Texas
Players of American football from Texas
Texas A&M Aggies football players
Chicago Cardinals players
St. Louis Cardinals (football) players
Dallas Cowboys players
Eastern Conference Pro Bowl players